Endrum Anbudan is a 1992 Indian Tamil-language drama film written and directed by R. Bhagyanathan in his debut. The film stars Murali, Sithara and Heera Rajagopal, with Manorama, Janagaraj and Chinni Jayanth in supporting roles. It was released on 14 August 1992.

Plot

Cast 
Murali as Thyagu
Sithara as Nandhini
Heera Rajagopal as Jennifer
Manorama
Janagaraj as Venkatachalam
Chinni Jayanth as Ashok
Charle as Munsamy
Senthil as Estry
Baby Monisha as Mallu
Mohan Raman as Nandhini's father
Chandrasekhar (guest appearance)

Production 
Endrum Anbudan was written and directed by R. Bhagyanathan who earlier assisted K. Bhagyaraj, and produced by G. Saravanan and T. G. Thyagarajan under Sathya Jyothi Films. Cinematography was handled by M. S. Annadurai, and the editing by Anil Malnad.

Soundtrack 
Soundtrack was composed by Ilaiyaraaja, and the songs were written by Vaali, Piraisoodan and R. Bhagyanathan.

Release and reception 
Endrum Anbudan was released on 14 August 1992. Ayyappa Prasad of The Indian Express wrote "Endrum Anbudan has a very interesting storyline ably directed and scripted by Bhagyanathan (debut) with excellent performances by Sitara and Murali in lead roles". C. R. K. of Kalki wrote the film had near perfect incidents, strong dialogues with complete subtlety but with inclusion of two fight scenes.

References

External links 
 

1990s Tamil-language films
1992 directorial debut films
1992 drama films
1992 films
Films scored by Ilaiyaraaja
Indian drama films